Sérgio Paulo Nascimento Filho known as Serginho (born 27 April 1988) is a footballer who currently plays for Paysandu. He claimed that he has dual citizen of Brazil and Syria.

Biography
Sérgio Filho (literally Sérgio Jr. or Sérgio II), also known as Serginho (literally little Sérgio), started his career in CFZ. He signed his first professional contract in May 2007. In January 2009 he extended his contract to 31 December 2010 and left for Atlético Tubarão. In March, at the mid of 2009 Campeonato Catarinense, he returned to Rio de Janeiro and played in 2009 Taça Rio.

In October 2009 he left for Santa Cruz in 1-year loan, winning 2009 Copa Pernambuco. He scored twice in that cup.

In August 2010 he left for Grêmio Barueri (that season known as Grêmio Prudente)

On 3 January 2011 he left for Paraná Clube in 1-year contract, replacing departed (attacking) midfielder Serginho Catarinense as a member of starting XI.

References

External links
 
 

1988 births
Living people
Brazilian footballers
Santa Cruz Futebol Clube players
Grêmio Barueri Futebol players
Paraná Clube players
Clube Atlético Bragantino players
Al-Ittihad Kalba SC players
AC Omonia players
Daegu FC players
Gangwon FC players
Cypriot First Division players
K League 2 players
Association football midfielders
Brazilian expatriate footballers
Expatriate footballers in the United Arab Emirates
Expatriate footballers in Cyprus
Expatriate footballers in South Korea
Footballers from Rio de Janeiro (city)
UAE Pro League players